"Thunder and Lightning" is a 1972 song by American singer and pianist Chi Coltrane. It was the first release from her eponymous debut album, peaking at No. 17 on the US Billboard Hot 100, No. 15 on Cash Box and No. 12 on Record World. It also charted at No. 18 on the Canadian RPM magazine singles chart.

Charts

References

External links
  

Chi Coltrane songs
1972 songs
1972 singles
Columbia Records singles